Raimo Sjöberg (born 25 September 1970) is a Swedish professional golfer.

On the Challenge Tour, Sjöberg won the 1999 Gula Sidorna Grand Prix and finished runner-up at the 2002 Challenge de Espana, the 1998 Warsaw Golf Open and the 1995 Lomas Bosque Challenge.

Sjöberg played 23 events on the European Tour where his best performance was a tie for fifth at the 2000 Madeira Island Open.

Professional wins (3)

Challenge Tour wins (1)

Nordic Golf League wins (2)

Team appearances
Amateur
Jacques Léglise Trophy (representing the Continent of Europe): 1988
European Amateur Team Championship (representing Sweden): 1989

References

External links

Swedish male golfers
European Tour golfers
Golfers from Stockholm
Sportspeople from Gothenburg
1970 births
Living people